Marco Bellocchio (born 9 November 1939) is an Italian film director, screenwriter, and actor.

Life and career
Born in Bobbio, near Piacenza, Marco Bellocchio had a strict Catholic upbringing – his father was a lawyer, his mother a schoolteacher. He began studying philosophy in Milan but then decided to enter film school, first at the Centro Sperimentale di Cinematografia in Rome, then at the Slade School of Fine Art in London. His first film, Fists in the Pocket, (I pugni in tasca, winner of the Silver Sail at the 1965 Festival del film Locarno), was funded by family members and shot on family property, in 1965.

Films
Bellocchio's films include China Is Near (1967), Sbatti il mostro in prima pagina (Slap the Monster on Page One) (1972), Nel Nome del Padre (In the name of the Father – a satire on a Catholic boarding school that shares affinities with Lindsay Anderson's If....) (1972),  Victory March (1976), A Leap in the Dark (1980), Henry IV (1984), Devil in the Flesh (1986), and My Mother's Smile (2002), which told the story of a wealthy Italian artist, a 'default-Marxist and atheist', who suddenly discovers that the Vatican is proposing to make his detested mother a saint.

In 1991 he won the Silver Bear – Special Jury Prize at the 41st Berlin International Film Festival for his film The Conviction.

In 1995 he directed a documentary about the Red Brigades and the kidnapping and murder of Aldo Moro, titled Broken Dreams. In 2003, he directed a feature film on the same theme, Good Morning, Night. In 2006 his film The Wedding Director was screened in the Un Certain Regard section at the 2006 Cannes Film Festival. In 1999, he was awarded with an Honorable Prize for the contribution to cinema at the 21st Moscow International Film Festival.

In 2009 he directed Vincere, which was in the main competition at the Cannes Film Festival. He finished Sorelle Mai, an experimental film that was shot over ten years with the students of six separate workshops playing themselves. He was awarded with the Golden Lion for Lifetime Achievement at the 68th Venice International Film Festival in September 2011.

His 2012 film Dormant Beauty was selected to compete for the Golden Lion at the 69th Venice International Film Festival. On 6 September 2012, Bellocchio condemned the Catholic Church's interference in politics after the premiere of his controversial film about a high-profile euthanasia case. The film approaches the topic of euthanasia and the difficulty with legislation on end of life in Italy, which has Vatican City within its borders. The subject is inspired by Eluana Englaro's case. Following the decision of the jury of the Venice Film Festival, which excluded the film from the Golden Lion, Bellocchio has expressed strong criticism against President Michael Mann.

Political activity
Bellocchio made a big impact on radical Italian cinema in the mid-1960s, and was a friend of Pasolini. In 1968, he joined the Union of Italian Communists (Marxist-Leninist), a Maoist group, and began to make politically militant cinema. However, in a 2002 interview, he talked about divided state of the Italian left, politics' lacking from the aim of radical change, and how such a radical change not being appealing for him anymore:

In another interview conducted in London Film Festival of 2006, he insisted still being a leftist, but argued for a need to reinvent the term:

He was candidate for Italian Parliament in 2006, with Rose in the Fist list, a political cartel made by socialists and Italian Radicals (a liberal, social liberal and libertarian party).

He is an atheist.

Filmography

Director
 La colpa e la pena (1961)
 Fists in the Pocket (1965)
 China Is Near (1967)
 Sbatti il mostro in prima pagina (1972)
 Victory March (1976)
 Il gabbiano (1977)
 A Leap in the Dark (1980)
 The Eyes, the Mouth (1982)
 Henry IV (1984)
 Devil in the Flesh (1986)
 The Witches' Sabbath (1988)
 The Conviction (1991)
 The Butterfly's Dream (1994)
 The Prince of Homburg (1996)
 The Nanny (1999)
 My Mother's Smile (2002)
 Good Morning, Night (2003)
 The Wedding Director (2006)
 Vincere (2009)
 Dormant Beauty (2012)
 Blood of My Blood (2015)
 Sweet Dreams (2017)
 The Traitor (2019)
 Marx Can Wait (2021)
 Exterior Night (2022)
 La Conversione (2023)

Writer
 Abbasso il zio (1961)
 La colpa e la pena (1961)
 Il ginepro fatto uomo (1962)
 Fists in the Pocket (1965)
 China is Near (1967)
 Il popolo calabrese ha rialzato la testa (1969) – co-direction
 Viva il 1º maggio rosso proletario (1969) – co-direction
 Discutiamo, discutiamo, episode of Love and Anger (1969) – co-direction
 Nel nome del padre (1972)
 Sbatti il mostro in prima pagina (1972)
 Matti da slegare (1975), co-directed with Silvano Agosti, Sandro Petraglia, Stefano Rulli
 Victory March (1976)
 Il gabbiano (1977)
 La macchina cinema (1979), co-directed with Silvano Agosti, Sandro Petraglia, Stefano Rulli
 A Leap in the Dark (1980)
 Vacanze in Val Trebbia (1980)
 The Eyes, the Mouth (1982)
 Henry IV (1984)
 Devil in the Flesh (1986)
 The Witches' Sabbath (1988)
 The Conviction (1991)
 The Butterfly's Dream (1994)
 Sogni infranti (1995) – TV documentary
 The Prince of Homburg (1996)
 La religione della storia (1998) – TV documentary
 The Nanny (1999)
 L'affresco (2000)
 Elena (2002)
 Appunti per un film su Zio Vanja (2002)
 Addio del passato (2002)
 My Mother's Smile (2002)
 Good Morning, Night (2003)
 The Wedding Director (2006)
 Sorelle (2006)
 Vincere (2009)
 Sorelle Mai (2010)
 Dormant Beauty (2012)
 Blood of My Blood (2015)
 Sweet Dreams (2016)
 The Traitor (2019)
 Marx can wait (2021)
 Esterno Notte (2022)

Actor
 Love and Anger (1969) - Lecturer (segment "Discutiamo discutiamo")
 N.P. (1971) - Preacher (voice)
 Pianeta Venere (1972)
 The Canterbury Tales (1972)  - voice of the greedy friar in the Summoner's Tale
 Sbatti il mostro in prima pagina (1972) - Giornalista Conferenza (uncredited)
 Tutto in comune (1974)
 Salò, or the 120 Days of Sodom (1975) - The President (voice, uncredited)
 Il gabbiano (1977) - Servant (uncredited)
 Vacanze in Val Trebbia (1980) - Il marito
 L'ora di religione (Il sorriso di mia madre) (2002)

References

External links

1939 births
Living people
Italian male film actors
Italian atheists
Italian film directors
Italian screenwriters
People from the Province of Piacenza
David di Donatello winners
European Film Awards winners (people)
Nastro d'Argento winners
Ciak d'oro winners
Italian Marxists
Italian socialists
Radical Party (Italy) politicians
20th-century Italian politicians
Critics of the Catholic Church
Italian male screenwriters